Frances Shaw may refer to:

 Frances Shaw (field hockey), see 2009 Women's Hockey Junior World Cup
 Frances Shaw, a character played by Jacqueline Bisset in Ally McBeal (1997–2002)

See also
 Frankie Shaw, Rachel Frances Shaw, American actress, writer and director
 Dinah Shore, Frances Shore, American singer, actress, television personality
 Francis Shaw (disambiguation)